Justin Layne (born January 12, 1998) is an American football cornerback who is a free agent. He played college football at Michigan State.

Early years
Layne attended Benedictine High School in Cleveland, Ohio. While there Layne was teammates with current NFL linebacker Jerome Baker. He played cornerback and wide receiver in high school. He committed to the Michigan State University to play college football.

College career
Layne entered his freshman season at Michigan State in 2016 as a wide receiver but was converted into a cornerback prior to the fifth game of the season. During his career, he played in 34 games and had 130 tackles, three interceptions, 0.5 sacks and one touchdown. After his junior season, Layne entered the 2019 NFL Draft.

Professional career

Pittsburgh Steelers
Layne was drafted by the Pittsburgh Steelers in the third round (83rd overall) of the 2019 NFL Draft. He briefly appeared in 10 games in 2019, getting only 3 tackles on the season.

Layne was placed on the reserve/COVID-19 list by the Steelers on July 29, 2020. He was activated on August 11, 2020. He appeared in all 16 games for the Steelers, and collected 22 tackles on the year. On August 30, 2022, he was released by the Steelers.

New York Giants
On August 31, 2022, Layne was claimed off waivers by the New York Giants. On November 14, 2022, he was waived.

Chicago Bears
On November 15, 2022, the Chicago Bears claimed Layne off waivers. He was waived on December 20.

Carolina Panthers
On December 21, 2022, Layne was claimed off waivers by the Carolina Panthers, but did not report to the team. He was released on March 8, 2023.

References

External links
Michigan State Spartans bio

1998 births
Living people
Players of American football from Cleveland
American football cornerbacks
Michigan State Spartans football players
Pittsburgh Steelers players
New York Giants players
Chicago Bears players
Carolina Panthers players